Kherliganj is a part of Atru city.

Kherliganj is a census town in Baran district in the Indian state of Rajasthan.

Demographics
 India census, Kherliganj had a population of 7391. Males constitute 52% of the population and females 48%. Kherliganj has an average literacy rate of 58%, lower than the national average of 59.5%: male literacy is 70%, and female literacy is 44%. In Kherliganj, 16% of the population is under 6 years of age.

References

Cities and towns in Baran district